"Bye and Bye We're (or, I'm) Going to See the King" is a Christian song from the African-American musical tradition. It is known by a variety of titles, including "I Wouldn't Mind Dying (If Dying Was All)" and "A Mother's Last Word to Her Daughter". It was recorded seven times before 1930, using the preceding titles.

It has been most often recorded in gospel or gospel blues style, but also in other styles such as country.

Description 

The song consists of several four-line verses (quatrains) and a repeated refrain. The words both of verses and of refrain often differ from one artist to another. A standard feature is that the refrain consists of four lines, the first three of which are identical. Common variants of those three lines include "Bye and bye we're (or, I'm) going to see the King" and "Holy, holy, holy is His name". The fourth line almost always begins "(I) wouldn't (or, don't) mind dying". It concludes in various ways in different versions, for example "If dying was all", or "But I gotta go by myself", or "Because I'm a child of God".

"The King" is a title of the Christian God.  Many versions include a verse which refers to the vision of the chariot in the Book of Ezekiel, Chapter 1.  A line found in many versions, "He said he saw him coming with his dyed garments on", alludes to the Book of Isaiah at 63:1:

Titles like "Bye and Bye We're Going to See the King" and "I Wouldn't Mind Dying (If Dying Was All)" are taken from the refrain. The title of the 1929 version by Washington Phillips, "A Mother's Last Word to Her Daughter", whose verses differ markedly from other versions, was presumably chosen to indicate that he intended it as a companion song to his "Mother's Last Word to Her Son" of 1927. Blind Mamie Forehand's 1927 performance of "I Wouldn't Mind Dying If Dying Was All" has been reissued on various Washington Phillips compilations, so Phillips is often confused to be the performer. YouTube has multiple videos doing just this, but Phillips never recorded this song, only his adaptation, "A Mother's Last Word to Her Daughter".

Recordings 

 1926Arizona Dranes, "Bye and Bye We're Going to See the King"  10" 78rpm single Okeh 8438-B 
 1927Blind Mamie Forehand, "Wouldn't Mind Dying If Dying Was All"  10" 78rpm single Victor 20574-A 
 1927Norfolk Jubilee Quartet, "I Wouldn't Mind Dying If Dying Was All"  10" 78rpm single Paramount 12630-B 
 1928Golden Leaf Quartet, "I Wouldn't Mind Dying"  10" 78rpm single Brunswick 7050 
 1928Rev. I. B. Ware with Wife and Son, "I Wouldn't Mind Dying (but I Gotta Go by Myself)"  10" 78rpm single Vocalion 1235  Note: This performance credits "wife" as the vocal accompaniment to Ware. The female vocals sound identical to Blind Mamie Forehand's vocals on her 1927 release so she may be the "wife" in the credits.
 1929Blind Willie Johnson, "Bye and Bye I'm Goin' to See the King"  10" 78rpm single Columbia 14504-D 
 1929Washington Phillips, "A Mother's Last Word to Her Daughter"  10" 78rpm single Columbia 14511-D 
 1932Carter Family, "I Wouldn't Mind Dying"  10" 78rpm single Victor 23807 
 1939Carter Family, "I Wouldn't Mind Dying"  radio broadcast 
 1939Smith Casey, "I Wouldn't Mind Dying If Dying Was All" 
 1939The Dixie Hummingbirds, "Wouldn't Mind Dying"  10" 78rpm single Decca 7667 
 1956Dorothy Love Coates and the Original Gospel Harmonettes, "I Wouldn't Mind Dying"  on the album Get on Board 
 1961Reverend Pearly Brown, "By and By (I'm Gonna See the King)"  on the album Georgia Street Singer 
 1965Mississippi Fred McDowell, "Bye and Bye"/"Wouldn't Mind Dying" 
 1981Flora Molton and the Truth Band, "Bye and Bye I'm Going To See the King"  on the album Living Country Blues USA, Vol. 3 
 1986R. Stevie Moore, "I Wouldn't Mind Dyin'"  on the album Glad Music
 1994Ben Harper, hidden track on the album Welcome to the Cruel World
 2002K. M. Williams, "Bye and Bye, I'm Goin' to See the King"  on the album Blind Willie's Hymns 
 2003John and Heidi Cerrigione, "A Mother's Last Word to Her Daughter"  on the album Wood Stoves and Bread Loaves 
 2003Davis Coen, "Bye and Bye I'm Goin' to See the King"  on the album Cryin' the Blues 
 2004Crush Collision Trio, "Bye and Bye I'm Going to See the King"  on the album Cold in Hand 
 2005Flat Mountain Girls, "Wouldn't Mind Dyin'"  on the album Honey Take Your Whiskers Off 
 2006Catfish Keith, "Bye and Bye, I'm Going to See the King"  on the album Rolling Sea 
 2007Francesco Garolfi, "Bye and Bye, I'm Going to See the King"  on the album The Blues I Feel 
 2009Catfish Keith, "By and By I'm Going to See the King"  on the album Live at the Half Moon 
 2010Heaven And, "Bye and Bye I'm Going To See the King "  on the album Bye and Bye I'm Going To See the King 
 2010Willie Salomon, "By and By I'm Gonna See the King" on the album Let Your Light Shine 
 2011Catfish Keith, "By and By, I'm Going to See the King"  on the album A True Friend Is Hard to Find: Gospel Retrospective 
 2012Ryan McGiver, "I Wouldn't Mind Dying" on the album Troubled in Mind

Other songs 
These songs have similar titles to the song which is the subject of this article, but are different from it and from each other:
 2010Jason Moon, "I Wouldn't Mind Dying Now"  on the album Naked Under All These Clothes 
 "Bye and Bye When the Morning Comes"/"We'll Understand It Better Bye and Bye", a different gospel song
 "We Shall See the King (When He Comes)", a different gospel song

See also 
 Ezekiel Saw the Wheel, a different gospel song which relates to the same passage in the Book of Ezekiel

References 

Songs about parting
Blues songs
Gospel songs
Year of song unknown
Songwriter unknown
Blind Willie Johnson songs
Washington Phillips songs
1929 songs
Carter Family songs
Brunswick Records singles
Columbia Records singles
Decca Records singles
Victor Records singles
Vocalion Records singles